Samsat District is a district of Adıyaman Province of Turkey. Its seat is the town Samsat. Its area is 319 km2, and its population is 7,313 (2021).

A survey from 2006 estimated that Kurds constituted 96% of the population of the district.

Geography
 
The new Samsat district is a peninsula surrounded on the three sides by the Atatürk Reservoir. The distance from the sea to the city centre is 470 km. The district is a plain that descends to the south.

In the hot summers and dry winters, while the Mediterranean climate is warm and rainy, it is similar to the South East Anatolian climate due to the low relative humidity. However, due to the influence of the Atatürk Reservoir in recent years, humidity has increased relatively.

Composition
There is 1 municipality in Samsat District:
Samsat

There are 16 villages in Samsat District:

 Akdamar
 Bağarası
 Bayırlı
 Çiçek
 Doğanca
 Gölpınar
 Göltarla
 Kırmacık
 Kızılöz
 Kovanoluk
 Kuştepe
 Ovacık
 Taşkuyu
 Tepeönü
 Uzuntepe
 Yarımbağ

References

Districts of Adıyaman Province